is the early evening news program broadcast domestically on NHK General TV and internationally on NHK World Premium. It has been on the air daily since April 5, 1993, from 7:00pm to 7:30pm (JST).

History

Chronology

Anchors

International broadcast 
The program is aired internationally on NHK World Premium (except in North America where it is aired on TV Japan instead), in its entirety in Japanese, with English second audio program (SAP) available. The program also airs in Australia on SBS WorldWatch nightly at 11pm.

References

External links

Japanese television news shows
1993 Japanese television series debuts
1990s Japanese television series
2000s Japanese television series
2010s Japanese television series
NHK original programming